Segundo Romance Tour  was a concert tour performed by Luis Miguel during the last part of 1994 to promote his last album. He began the tour in Mexico before the official release of Segundo Romance, performing the new songs of the album on the 16 sold-out concerts at the National Auditorium in Mexico City.

The tour consisted of well over 1 million people attending his shows, of which 25 performances were throughout major cities in the United States, most of them sold out.

History
To promote the album, Miguel began his Segundo Romance Tour in August 1994 with 16 shows at the National Auditorium in Mexico City, which drew an audience of more than 155,000. Miguel performed throughout Mexico, the United States and Argentina until December 31, 1994, when the tour concluded in Acapulco. The first part of Miguel's set list featured pop songs and contemporary ballads; during the second half he sang boleros from Segundo Romance and ranchera songs, before closing with "Será Que No Me Amas", the Spanish version of the Jackson 5's "Blame It on the Boogie".

In October 1995, Warner Music released the El Concierto live album and video, a compilation of Miguel's performances at the National Auditorium in Mexico City and his concert at the José Amalfitani Stadium in Buenos Aires. Stephen Thomas Erlewine of AllMusic praised its production and Miguel's performance.

Set List 
This set list is from the August 28, 1994, concert in Mexico City. It does not represent all dates throughout the tour.

 "Luz Verde"
 "América, América"
 "Pensar En Ti"
 "Dame Tú Amor"
 "No Sé Tú"
 "Alguien Como Tú" (Somebody In Your Life)
 Ballads Medley:
"Yo Que No Vivo Sin Ti"
"Culpable O No" 
"Mas Allá de Todo"
"Fría Como el Viento"
"Entrégate"
"Tengo Todo Excepto a Ti"
"La Incondicional"
 "Suave"
 "Hasta Que Me Olvides"
 "Interlude" (Band)
 "Que Nivel De Mujer" (Attitude Dance)
 "Historia De Un Amor"
 "Nosotros"
 "Como Yo Te Amé"
 "Somos Novios"
 "Sin Ti"
 "El Día Que Me Quieras"
 "La Media Vuelta"
 "Si Nos Dejan"
 "De Que Manera Te Olvido"
 "El Rey"
 "Será Que No Me Amas"

Tour dates

Note: Some dates and venues are missing due to the lack of reliable sources.

Tour personnel

Band
Luis Miguel - Vocals
Kiko Cibrian - Musical Director, Acoustic Guitar, Electric Guitar
Gerardo Carrillo - Bass
Victor Loyo - Drums
Francisco Loyo - Piano, Keyboards
Arturo Pérez - Keyboards
Leonardo López - Percussion, Chorus
Juan Manuel Arpero - Trumpet
Armando Cedillo - Trumpet
Alejandro Carballo - Trombone
Jeff Nathanson - Saxofone
Coco Potenza - Bandoneon
Armando Manzanero - Grand Piano (selected dates)
Patricia Tanus - Backing Vocals
Fedra Vargas - Backing Vocals
Ana Espina Salinas - Backing Vocals
Mariachi 2000

References

Luis Miguel concert tours
1994 concert tours

pt:Segundo Romance Tour